Scythris simplicella is a moth of the family Scythrididae. It was described by Bengt Å. Bengtsson in 2014. It is found in South Africa (Limpopo).

References

Endemic moths of South Africa
simplicella
Moths described in 2014